Syyrah: The Warp Hunter is a 1997 game developed by Pixelstorm and published by Sun Corporation.

Critical reception 
PC Games gave it a rating of 44%.

References

External links

1997 video games
Windows-only games
Windows games
Sunsoft games